Jemez National Forest in New Mexico was established as the Jemez Forest Reserve by the U.S. Forest Service on October 12, 1905 with .  It became a National Forest on March 4, 1907. On July 1, 1915 most of the forest was combined with Pecos National Forest to establish Santa Fe National Forest, and the name was discontinued. A portion was previously transferred to Carson National Forest in 1908. 

The Jemez forest is administered as the Jemez, Coyote and Cuba Ranger Districts and the western portion of  the Espanola Ranger District of Santa Fe National Forest, comprising all SFNF lands to the west of Santa Fe. The forest almost entirely surrounds the Valles Caldera National Preserve, which is managed by the National Park Service as a "national preserve." The Valles Caldera National Preserve was managed by an independent "Trust" between 2000 and 2015. Congress extinguished the Trust in December 2014. This region is rich with archaeological sites associated with the ancestral Puebloan people.

References

External links
Jemez Ranger District, Santa Fe National Forest
Forest History Society
Listing of the National Forests of the United States and Their Dates (from the Forest History Society website) Text from Davis, Richard C., ed. Encyclopedia of American Forest and Conservation History. New York: Macmillan Publishing Company for the Forest History Society, 1983. Vol. II, pp. 743-788.

Former National Forests of New Mexico
Protected areas of Rio Arriba County, New Mexico
Protected areas of Sandoval County, New Mexico
Protected areas of Santa Fe County, New Mexico
Santa Fe National Forest
1907 establishments in New Mexico Territory
Protected areas established in 1907
1915 disestablishments in New Mexico
Protected areas disestablished in 1915